Putzeysia is a genus of sea snails, marine gastropod molluscs in the family Eucyclidae,

Species
Species within the genus Putzeysia include:
 Putzeysia cillisi Segers, Swinnen & De Prins, 2009
 Putzeysia franziskae Engl & Rolán, 2009
 Putzeysia juttae Engl & Rolán, 2009
 Putzeysia rickyi Reitano & Scuderi, 2021
 Putzeysia wiseri (Calcara, 1842)

References

External links
 Sulliotti, G. R. (1889). Comunicazioni malacologiche. Articolo primo. Bullettino della Società Malacologica Italiana. 14: 25-44
 Gofas, S.; Le Renard, J.; Bouchet, P. (2001). Mollusca, in: Costello, M.J. et al. (Ed.) (2001). European register of marine species: a check-list of the marine species in Europe and a bibliography of guides to their identification. Collection Patrimoines Naturels, 50: pp. 180–213

 
Eucyclidae